The lined pocketbook (Lampsilis binominata) was a species of freshwater river mussel, an aquatic bivalve in the family Unionidae the river mussels. This species was endemic to the United States. It is now extinct.

A study done by the University of Georgia Museum of Natural Science showed that Lined Pocketbook filtered water through their gills, leading to the digestion of trapped food particles.

References

Lampsilis
Molluscs described in 1900
Taxonomy articles created by Polbot